"All Apologies" is the ninth episode of the American sports comedy-drama television series Ted Lasso, based on the character played by Jason Sudeikis in a series of promos for NBC Sports' coverage of England's Premier League. The episode was written by Phoebe Walsh and directed by MJ Delaney. It was released on Apple TV+ on September 25, 2020.

The series follows Ted Lasso, an American college football coach, who is unexpectedly recruited to coach a fictional English Premier League soccer team, AFC Richmond, despite having no experience coaching soccer. The team's owner, Rebecca Welton, hires Lasso hoping he will fail as a means of exacting revenge on the team's previous owner, Rupert, her unfaithful ex-husband. In the episode, Ted faces a dilemma as Roy's age is showing during training, which could jeopardize the club's performance. Meanwhile, Rebecca is pressured by Keeley to reveal the truth to Ted.

The episode received extremely positive reviews from critics, who praised the performances, emotional tone, character development and set-up for the finale. For their performances in the episode, Brett Goldstein and Hannah Waddingham won Outstanding Supporting Actor in a Comedy Series and Outstanding Supporting Actress in a Comedy Series at the 73rd Primetime Emmy Awards.

Plot
Roy (Brett Goldstein) has felt pressure in the latest matches, where commentators note that his age is showing despite the club's improvement. Rebecca (Hannah Waddingham) is also pressured by Keeley (Juno Temple) to tell Ted (Jason Sudeikis) about her role in the Paparazzi's photographs.

Beard (Brendan Hunt) and Nate (Nick Mohammed) suggest that Roy must be benched for their final game against Manchester City F.C., but Ted refuses to do it, causing them to stop talking to him. Ted is called to Rebecca's office, where she can't bring herself to reveal the truth. Suddenly, Rupert (Anthony Head) shows up to inform Rebecca that he is having a baby with Bex, despite telling Rebecca that he never wanted children. This prompts her to head to Ted's office and confess her plan to ruin the club and hiring the paparazzi. To her surprise, Ted forgives her, claiming that divorces can negatively impact a person. His forgiveness prompts her to contact Higgins (Jeremy Swift) to apologize for everything, which he accepts.

Ted meets with Roy to discuss benching him, which Roy refuses to do. Roy confides in Keeley that he is concerned that his career may be ending. Keeley than has his niece, Phoebe, motivate him, telling him that she admires him for always believing in himself. At a bar, Ted meets with Beard, telling him he intends to keep Roy in the line-up as he does not mind losing. Beard finally snaps, angrily telling him that winning is important for the club, as it is in danger of relegation. He tells him that he should not hold the club accountable just for Roy and storms out. A drunk Ted meets with Roy at his apartment, telling him he will bench him, which Roy agrees to do. To save his reputation, they agree to deem the benching due to an injury. The next day, Roy shows up for training donning a second team pinny, accepting his role in the bench.

Development

Production
The character of Ted Lasso first appeared in 2013 as part of NBC Sports promoting their coverage of the Premier League, portrayed by Jason Sudeikis. In October 2019, Apple TV+ gave a series order to a series focused on the character, with Sudeikis reprising his role and co-writing the episode with executive producer Bill Lawrence. Sudeikis and collaborators Brendan Hunt and Joe Kelly started working on a project around 2015, which evolved further when Lawrence joined the series. The episode was directed by MJ Delaney and written by Phoebe Walsh. This was Delaney's first directing credit, and Walsh's first writing credit for the show.

Casting
The series announcement confirmed that Jason Sudeikis would reprise his role as the main character. Other actors who are credited as series regulars include Hannah Waddingham, Jeremy Swift, Phil Dunster, Brett Goldstein, Brendan Hunt, Nick Mohammed, and Juno Temple.

Critical reviews

"All Apologies" received extremely positive reviews from critics. Gissane Sophia of Marvelous Geeks Media wrote, "'All Apologies' is the kind of episode that not only changes the trajectory of the character journeys, but it cements the thematic importance of belief that Ted Lasso is grounded in. It tells its audience that the person we choose to be, when taking frightening routes is what matters most and it reiterates the importance of an apology, which we've been seeing from the start." 

Mads Lennon of FanSided wrote, "Ultimately, Ted wants Roy to attend the next practice and game, but it'll be up to him to decide. Thankfully, the next day at work is a happy one. Higgins is back, and Roy shows up to practice to support his team as a good captain should." Daniel Hart of Ready Steady Cut gave the episode a 4 star rating out of 5 wrote, "The penultimate episode is all about compassion and kindness as Ted has a big decision to make."

Awards and accolades
Brett Goldstein and Hannah Waddingham submitted this episode for consideration for their Primetime Emmy Award for Outstanding Supporting Actor in a Comedy Series and Primetime Emmy Award for Outstanding Supporting Actress in a Comedy Series nominations at the 73rd Primetime Emmy Awards. They would win their respective awards, their first Emmy wins.

References

External links
 

Ted Lasso episodes
2020 American television episodes